The 1999 Latvian Individual Speedway Championship was the 25th Latvian Individual Speedway Championship season with finals on 12 August 1999 in Daugavpils, Latvia.

Results
 August 12, 1999
  Daugavpils

Speedway in Latvia
1999 in Latvian sport
1999 in speedway